Constans II (7 November 630 – 15 July 668), nicknamed "the Bearded", was the Byzantine emperor from 641 to 668. Constans was the last attested emperor to serve as consul, in 642, although the office continued to exist until the reign of Leo VI the Wise (r. 886–912). His religious policy saw him steering a middle line in disputes between the Orthodoxy and Monothelitism by refusing to persecute either and prohibited discussion of the natures of Jesus Christ under the Type of Constans in 648. His reign coincided with Muslim invasions under Mu'awiya I in the late 640s to 650s. Constans was the first emperor to visit Rome since the fall of the Western Roman Empire in 476, and the last one to visit Rome while it was still held by the Empire.

Origins and early career

Constans was born on 7 November 630 in Constantinople, the East-Roman capital. His father Constantine III was son of Emperor Heraclius. After the death of Heraclius, Constantine III co-ruled with Heraclonas, his half-brother through Heraclius' second marriage to Martina, but died after three months. Constans was most likely elevated to caesar by his father in order to secure his succession to the throne against Martina and her sons. Constans' mother Gregoria was a daughter of Nicetas, a first cousin of Heraclius. 

Following his father's death in May 641, the 10-year old Constans II was named co-emperor due to rumors that Heraclonas and Martina poisoned Constantine III. Later that same year, Heraclonas was deposed by Valentinus, one of Heraclius’ most trusted generals, and Constans II was left as sole emperor. Constans owed his rise to the throne to a popular reaction against his uncle and to the protection of the soldiers led by Valentinus. Although the precocious emperor addressed the senate with a speech blaming Heraclonas and Martina for eliminating his father, he reigned under a regency of senators led by Patriarch Paul II of Constantinople. In 644, Valentinus attempted to seize power for himself, but failed.

Reign as emperor
Under Constans, the Byzantines completely withdrew from Egypt in 642, and the third Rashidun caliph Uthman launched numerous attacks on the islands of the Mediterranean and Aegean Seas. A Byzantine fleet under the admiral Manuel occupied Alexandria again in 645, and the Alexandrians hailed him as a liberator, since the caliphate levied heavier taxes and showed less respect for their religion. However, Manuel squandered his time and popularity in plundering the countryside, and eventually the Arab army managed to force him to embark for home. The situation was complicated by the violent opposition to Monothelitism by the clergy in the west and the related rebellion of the Exarch of Carthage, Gregory the Patrician. The latter fell in battle against the army of caliph Uthman, and the region remained a vassal state under the Caliphate until civil war broke out and imperial rule was again restored.

Constans attempted to steer a middle line in the church dispute between Orthodoxy and Monothelitism by refusing to persecute either and prohibiting further discussion of the natures of Jesus Christ by decree in 648 (the Type of Constans). Naturally, this live-and-let-live compromise satisfied few passionate participants in the dispute.

Meanwhile, the advance of the Rashidun Caliphate continued unabated. In 647 they entered Armenia and Cappadocia and sacked Caesarea Mazaca. In the same year, they raided Africa and killed Gregory. In 648, the Arabs raided into Phrygia, and in 649 they launched their first maritime expedition against Crete. A major Arab offensive into Cilicia and Isauria in 650–651 forced the Emperor to enter into negotiations with Caliph Uthman's governor of Syria, Mu'awiya I, who later reigned as the first Umayyad caliph. The truce that followed allowed a short respite and made it possible for Constans to hold on to the western portions of Armenia.

In 654, however, Mu'awiya renewed his raids by sea, plundering Rhodes. Constans led a fleet to attack the Muslims at Phoinike (off Lycia) in 655 at the Battle of the Masts, but he was defeated: 500 Byzantine ships were destroyed in the battle, and the Emperor himself was almost killed. The sea battle was so devastating that the emperor escaped only by trading clothes with one of his men. Before the battle, chronicler Theophanes the Confessor says, the Emperor dreamed of being at Thessalonika; this dream predicted his defeat against the Arabs because the word Thessalonika is similar to the sentence "thes allo niken", which means "gave victory to another (the enemy)".  Caliph Uthman was preparing to attack Constantinople, but he did not carry out the plan, as the first Fitna broke out in 656.

In 658, with the eastern frontier under less pressure, Constans defeated the Slavs in the Balkans, temporarily reasserting some notion of Byzantine rule over them and resettled some of them in Anatolia (ca. 649 or 667). In 659 he campaigned far to the east, taking advantage of a rebellion against the Caliphate in Media. The same year he concluded peace with the Arabs.

Now Constans could turn to church matters once again. Pope Martin I had condemned both Monothelitism and Constans' attempt to halt debates over it in the Lateran Council of 649. The Emperor ordered the Exarch of Ravenna to arrest the Pope. Exarch Olympius excused himself from this task, but his successor, Theodore I Calliopas, carried it out in 653. Pope Martin was brought to Constantinople and condemned as a criminal, ultimately being exiled to Cherson, where he died in 655.

Constans grew increasingly fearful that his younger brother, Theodosius, could oust him from the throne; he therefore obliged Theodosius to take holy orders and later had him killed in 660. Constans' sons Constantine, Heraclius, and Tiberius had been associated on the throne since the 650s. However, having attracted the hatred of the citizens of Constantinople, Constans decided to leave the capital and to move to Syracuse in Sicily.

On his way, he stopped in Greece and fought the Slavs at Thessalonica with success. Then, in the winter of 662–663, he made his camp at Athens.

From there, in 663, he continued to Italy. He launched an assault against the Lombard Duchy of Benevento, which then encompassed most of Southern Italy. Taking advantage of the fact that Lombard king Grimoald I of Benevento was engaged against Frankish forces from Neustria, Constans disembarked at Taranto and besieged Lucera and Benevento. However, the latter resisted and Constans withdrew to Naples. During the journey from Benevento to Naples, Constans II was defeated by Mitolas, Count of Capua, near Pugna. Constans ordered Saburrus, the commander of his army, to attack the Lombards again, but he was defeated by the Beneventani at Forino, between Avellino and Salerno.

In 663 Constans visited Rome for twelve days—the first emperor since the fall of the Western Roman Empire in 476 and, along with John VIII Palaiologos, one of only two Eastern Roman emperors since the division of the Roman empire in 395 to set foot in Rome—and was received with great honor by Pope Vitalian (657–672). Although on friendly terms with Vitalian, he stripped buildings (including the Pantheon) of their ornaments and bronze to be carried back to Constantinople, and in 666 declared the Pope to have no jurisdiction over the Archbishop of Ravenna, since that city was the seat of the Exarch, his immediate representative.  His subsequent moves in Calabria and Sardinia were marked by further strippings and request of tributes that enraged his Italian subjects.

According to Warren Treadgold, the first themes were created between 659 and 661, during the reign of Constans II.

Death and succession 
On 15 July 668, he was assassinated in his bath by his chamberlain, either killed with a bucket or stabbed with a knife. His son Constantine succeeded him as Constantine IV. A brief usurpation in Sicily by Mezezius was quickly suppressed by the new emperor.

Assessments and legacy 

The historian Robert Hoyland asserts that Mu'awiya was a significant Islamic challenge for Constans to "deny [the divinity of] Jesus and turn to the Great God who I worship, the God of our father Abraham" and speculates that Mu'awiya's tour of Christian sites in Jerusalem was done to demonstrate "the fact that he, and not the Byzantine emperor, was now God's representative on earth".

Record in Chinese sources 

The Chinese dynastic histories of the Old Book of Tang and New Book of Tang mention several embassies made by Fu lin (拂菻), which they equated with Daqin (the Roman Empire). These are recorded as having begun in the year 643 with an embassy sent by the king Boduoli (波多力, Constans II Pogonatos) to Emperor Taizong of Tang, bearing gifts such as red glass and green gemstones. Other contacts are reported taking place in 667, 701, and perhaps 719, sometimes through Central Asian intermediaries. These histories also record that the Arabs (Da shi 大食) sent their commander "Mo-yi" (Chinese: 摩拽伐之, Pinyin: Mó zhuāi fá zhī), to besiege the Byzantine capital, Constantinople, and forced the Byzantines to pay them tribute.

This Arab commander "Mo-yi" was identified by historian Friedrich Hirth as Muawiyah I (r. 661–680), the governor of Syria before becoming the Umayyad caliph. The same books also described Constantinople in some detail as having massive granite walls and a water clock mounted with a golden statue of man. The Byzantine historian Theophylact Simocatta, writing during the reign of Heraclius (r. 610–641), relayed information about China's geography, its capital city Khubdan (Old Turkic: Khumdan, i.e. Chang'an), its current ruler Taisson whose name meant "Son of God" (Chinese: Tianzi), and correctly pointed to its reunification by the Sui Dynasty (581–618) as occurring during the reign of Maurice, noting that China had previously been divided politically along the Yangzi River by two warring nations.

Family
By his wife Fausta, a daughter of the patrician Valentinus, Constans II had three sons:
 Constantine IV, who succeeded him as Emperor
 Heraclius, co-emperor from 659 to 681
 Tiberius, co-emperor from 659 to 681

Coinage gallery

Ancestry

See also

List of Byzantine emperors

Notes

References

Bibliography
 

 
 

 
 
 
 

 
 
Liber Pontificalis
Paul the Deacon, Historia Langobardorum, Book V
	

|-

630 births
668 deaths
7th-century Byzantine emperors
7th-century murdered monarchs
Heraclian dynasty
Medieval child monarchs
Assassinated Byzantine emperors
Imperial Roman consuls
640s in the Byzantine Empire
650s in the Byzantine Empire
660s in the Byzantine Empire
Sons of Byzantine emperors